Siegfried Taubert (born December 11, 1880, in Brallentin, Poland, died February 13, 1946, in Kiel) was Nazi, SS-Obergruppenführer, General of the Waffen-SS and Schutzstaffel (SS) Police general. Taubert died in Kiel in 1946.

Early life and World War I
Siegfried Taubert was born on December 11, 1880, in Brallentin, his father was a Protestant pastor. After passing his university entrance test, enrolled in military school as a Fahnenjunker (junior). He was assigned to the Infantry Regiment Duke Ferdinand von Braunschweig 57 in Wesel-Westphalia. On May 5, 1904, he married Arnoldine Johanna Juta from the Netherlands; they had three children, including Ilse, who married Ernst-Robert Grawitz a SS German physician. From 1914 to 1918 he was a career officer during World War I. In November 1919 he departed the army with the rank of major. From 1921 to 1924 he became an industrial Manager in Poland and leader in steel helmet factory in Greifenhagen. In August 1925 Taubert sold his house in the Greifenhagen and moved to Berlin and worked as a sales manager in a piano factory. In 1931 he moved over to insurance work at the Swiss Life Insurance and Pension Fund in Berlin. and was thereafter unemployed. In 1931 he lost his job and became politically active in the Frontbann, also Tannenbergbund organizations.

Nazi career and World War II
In 1931 he join the Nazi Party (membership number 525.246) and the Schutzstaffel (SS number 23.128). Working for SS General Kurt Daluege, he was promoted to SS-Oberführer. From 1935 to 1938 Taubert was the chief of staff in Reinhard Heydrich's Sicherheitsdienst (Security Service; SD) in the main SS office. On September 13, 1936, he was promoted to SS-Brigadeführer. From 1938 to 1945 he was the captain of the SS Wewelsburg castle, after Manfred von Knobelsdorff. The SS Wewelsburg castle was Heinrich Himmler's SS headquarter and training center for head SS officers.
Taubert duties often took him away from the Wewelsburg castle. Before the war, Taubert used the Reich Labor Service for Himmler's SS Research and Education Center projects at the castle, when the war in Europe started he then used concentration camp inmates. The inmate laborers were housed behind barbed wire in the neighboring village of Niederhage. Taubert became the lay judge at the People's Court Volksgerichtshof. He also was the adjutant captain of the castle Gottlieb Bernhardt. In October 1943 Taubert visited the Princess Sophie of Greece and Denmark at Himmler request. In 1943 he became SS-Obergruppenführer and General of the Waffen-SS. Near the end of World War II in Europe, on March 31, 1945, he fled from Wewelsburg castle to Schleswig-Holstein as the US 3rd Armored Division approached the castle. Taubert knowing that US Army was coming, he had the castle antiquities and artworks packed and moved to the nearby Boddeker estate, while others were moved and hidden in other facilities and nearby homes. Some art was hidden within the walls of the estate’s buildings. Himmler ordered  Wewelsburg castle destroyed, but Taubert refused. Taubert died in Kiel in 1946.

Ranks
    Fahnenjunker: 30 August 1899
    Fähnrich: 18 April 1900
    Leutnant: 18 January 1901
    Oberleutnant: 22 Marh 1910
    Hauptmann: 5 September 1914
    Major i.G :[1] 22 February 1919
    SS-Anwärter: 2 January 1932
    SS-Mann: 10 September 1932
    SS-Truppführer: 17 February 1933
    SS-Untersturmführer: 12 June 1933
    SS-Obersturmführer: 3 September 1933
    SS-Hauptsturmführer: 9 November 1933
    SS-Sturmbannführer: 1 January 1934
    SS-Obersturmbannführer: 20 April 1934
    SS-Standartenführer: 4 July 1934
    SS-Oberführer: 15 September 1935
    SS-Brigadeführer: 13 September 1936
    SS-Gruppenführer: 11 September 1938
    SS-Obergruppenführer and General of the Waffen-SS on 30 January 1943

Awards
    Iron Cross (1914) 2nd and 1st class
    Wound Badge (1918) in black
    War Merit Cross (1939) with swords 2nd class
    Honour Sword of Reichsführer-SS
    SS skull ring
 Hanseatic Cross
Cross for Military Merit, 3rd Class
 War Merit Cross, 1st Class
Honour Chevron for the Old Guard
Nazi Party Long Service Award

See also 
Register of SS leaders in general's rank
 Chiemsee Cauldron
 Heinz Macher
 Nazism and occultism
 Ordensburg Vogelsang

References

1880 births
1946 deaths
SS-Obergruppenführer
German Army personnel of World War I
SS and Police Leaders